The DualShock (originally known as Dual Shock; trademarked as DUALSHOCK or DUAL SHOCK; with the PlayStation 5 version named DualSense) is a line of gamepads with vibration-feedback and analog controls developed by Sony Interactive Entertainment for the PlayStation family of systems. Introduced in November 1997, it was initially marketed as a secondary peripheral for the original PlayStation, with updated versions of the PlayStation console including the controller, Sony subsequently phased out the controller that was originally included with the console, called the PlayStation controller, as well as the Sony Dual Analog Controller. The DualShock is the best-selling gamepad of all time in terms of units sold, excluding bundled controllers.

DualShock 

The DualShock Analog Controller (models: SCPH-1200; US models: SCPH-110U), is capable of providing vibration feedback based on onscreen actions taking place in a game (if the game supports this feature), and provides analog input through two analog sticks. Its name derives from its use of two (dual) vibration motors (shock). These motors are housed within the handles of the DualShock controller, with the left one being larger and more powerful than the one on the right, so to allow for levels of vibration that vary. The DualShock is different from the Nintendo 64's Rumble Pak in this respect as the Nintendo 64’s Rumble Pak uses only one motor. The Rumble Pak uses power from a battery for the vibration effect but all corded varieties of the DualShock use power supplied by the PlayStation. The rumble feature of the DualShock is similar to the Japanese version of the Dual Analog Controller, a feature that was removed shortly after that controller was released.

The DualShock, like its predecessor the Dual Analog controller, has two analog sticks. Unlike the earlier controller, the DualShock's analog sticks feature textured rubber grips rather than the smooth plastic tips with recessed grooves found on the Dual Analog controller. Other visible differences between Dual Analog and the DualShock include the longer grips and handles and slightly larger L2/R2 buttons. The Dual Analog controller also has an additional mode accessible by pressing the "Analog" button that provides compatibility with the PlayStation Analog Joystick which results in the analog indicator light turning green instead of red being able to play on other devices; unfortunately this feature was removed from the DualShock.

The DualShock, and its following designs also includes a direction pad, Start and Select button, and four face buttons with labelling, which was first introduced on the original PlayStation controller(Ps 1 controller)the  using simple geometric shapes which include, a green triangle, a red circle, a blue cross, and a pink square. The controller's designer Teiyu Goto had intended the circle and cross to represent "yes" and "no" respectively as common in Japanese culture, and thus typically used for "confirm" and "cancel" in most PlayStation games respectively, and placed similarly to the A and B buttons on the Super Famicom controller which had similar functions, while the triangle symbolizes a point of view and the square is equated to a sheet of paper there to be used to access menus. In Western releases, the circle and cross functions are often switched (circle to cancel, cross to confirm) or reassigned to a different button (cross to confirm, triangle to cancel).

The DualShock controller is widely supported; shortly after its launch most new games, including Waku Waku Puyo Puyo Dungeon, Crash Bandicoot: Warped, Spyro the Dragon, and Tekken 3 include support for the vibration feature and dual analog sticks, and Capcom re-released Resident Evil: Director's Cut and Resident Evil 2 with support for the controller added to these newer versions. Some games designed for the Dual Analog's vibration capability, such as Porsche Challenge and Crash Bandicoot 2, also work. Many games take advantage of the presence of two motors to provide vibration effects in stereo including Gran Turismo and the PlayStation port of Quake II. Released in 1999, the PlayStation hit Ape Escape is the first game to explicitly require DualShock/Dual-Analog-type controllers, with its gameplay requiring the use of both analog sticks.

In 2000, the PS one (a redesigned version of the original PlayStation) was released with a slightly redesigned DualShock Controller (SCPH-110(U)). This controller was similar to the first one, except with a "PSone" word mark replacing "PlayStation" underneath the logo, a purple hue on the buttons and sticks to match the color scheme of the PSone, a semicircle-shaped connector, and multiple color options for the body.

The DualShock is compatible with the PlayStation 2, as they use the same connector and protocol. However, certain PS2 games that utilize the DualShock 2's analog buttons, such as The Bouncer, are not compatible with the DualShock. The DualShock is fully compatible with the PlayStation 2's backwards compatibility to play PlayStation games.

DualShock 2 

The DualShock 2 Analog Controller (SCPH-10010; US models: SCPH-10010U/97026) included with PlayStation 2's launch is almost identical externally as the previous DualShock analog controller, with a few minor cosmetic changes. It has different screw positioning and one fewer screw. A blue DualShock 2 logo was added to the top of the controller, the connector is more square than the DualShock, and both the cable and connector are black rather than grey. The standard controller is black (other colors came later), rather than grey as with the original DualShock. The analog sticks are also noticeably stiffer than on the original DualShock.

Internally, the DualShock 2 was lighter and all of the buttons (except for the Analog mode, start, select, L3 and R3 buttons) were readable as analog values (pressure-sensitive). The DualShock 2 can sense 256 levels of pressure.

The DualShock 2 has been made available in various colors: black, satin silver, ceramic white, slate grey, clear, ocean blue, emerald green, crimson red, lemon yellow, and candy pink.

Some coin operated arcade cabinets also had connections that allowed the user to use DualShock or DualShock 2 controllers. The notable ones are Namco's Tekken 5 and Konami's Winning Eleven Arcade Championship 2012.

The original PlayStation is forward compatible with the DualShock 2. The PlayStation 3 is backward compatible with the DualShock and DualShock 2 by the use of third party peripherals, which connect the controller to the console via a USB port. However, the DualShock and DualShock 2 will not work properly with games that require Sixaxis functionality, such as Heavy Rain.

DualShock 3 

Announced at the 2007 Tokyo Game Show, the DualShock 3 wireless controller (SCPH-98050/CECHZC2) is a gamepad for the PlayStation 3. It replaces the Sixaxis wireless controller originally released with earlier versions of the console. The DualShock 3 is nearly identical to the previous Sixaxis version but adds the haptic feedback capabilities found in the DualShock and DualShock 2. Sony settled a patent infringement lawsuit with Immersion in March 2007 following a lengthy legal battle. The settlement cleared the way for incorporating the missing "rumble" feature that the Sixaxis lacked. Both the vibration function and motion-sensing capabilities of the DualShock 3 can be used simultaneously without one interfering with the other. Like the Sixaxis, it also has a USB mini-B port for charging and can also be used on a PSP Go via Bluetooth, though the controller and the PSP Go must be registered using a PS3 console.

The DualShock 3 can be identified by its "DualShock 3" and "Sixaxis" markings. It also weighs , 40% more than its predecessor, the Sixaxis, which weighed only .

The rear markings indicate the original DualShock 3 draws up to 300 mA of current at 3.7 V for a power consumption of 1.11 W, an order of magnitude increase from the 30 mA of current at 3.7 V (0.111 W) listed on the Sixaxis. However, this current is not drawn constantly and is the maximum current when the rumble is active. Its main power source is an internal 3.7 V Li-ion battery tentatively capable of storing 570 mAh, which provides up to 30 hours of continuous gaming on a full charge. Third party replacement batteries are also available. Like the Sixaxis, the DualShock 3 comes with instructions on how to remove and replace the battery. The DualShock 3 can also draw power over a USB cable via a USB mini-B connector on the top of the controller. This allows the controller to be used when the battery is low and is also used for charging the battery. When connected via USB, the controller communicates with the console through the USB cable, rather than Bluetooth.

Along with the release of the 'slim' model PS3, Sony released a new version of the DualShock 3 (A1) which uses 5.0 V at 500 mA while connected, but still contains a 3.7 V battery. This revision of the DualShock 3 does away with the additional plastic brackets between the L1/R1 buttons and the L2/R2 triggers (increasing controller rigidity), has indicator lights soldered directly to the board, and comes in slightly revised color schemes.

While the DualShock 3 is compatible with any standard USB mini-B cable and many USB chargers, official charging cables are available from Sony. These include an official cable, the USB 2.0 Cable Pack and a wall charger, the AC adapter charging kit. Any third-party USB charger used must act as a USB host device, rather than simply providing power over the appropriate pins, since both the Sixaxis and DualShock 3 require a host signal to "wake up" and begin charging.

A Sony representative confirmed on April 2, 2008, that the original Sixaxis controller would officially be discontinued with the release of the haptic-feedback enabled DualShock 3 in mid-April 2008. The Sixaxis was no longer produced after 2008, being dropped from stock by most retailers.

Variations
The DualShock 3 has been produced in various colors: black, satin silver, ceramic white, classic white, metallic blue, deep red, pink, "jungle green" (olive), "candy blue" (light blue), "urban camouflage" (three-color digital camouflage), "crimson red" (transparent red), and "cosmic blue" (transparent blue). Not all colors have been made available in all markets or at all times.

Additional colors have also been made available alongside limited edition consoles, including gun-metal grey and "cloud black" (dark grey).

A limited edition baseball themed DualShock 3 controller was released on March 8, 2011 to coincide with the release of MLB 11: The Show. Another color, "Metallic Gold", became available in June 2012 as a limited edition in Europe, while in North America it is sold exclusively in GameStop from October 2012. A limited edition God of War: Ascension controller is available in the UK as part of a console bundle to coincide with the launch of the game and in the Americas as a game and controller bundle. On November 1, 2013 Sony announced a new see-through "Crystal" model of the DualShock 3 controller in Japan.

DualShock 4 

The DualShock 4 (CUH-ZCT1) is the PlayStation 4's controller. It has several new features from DualShock 3. One new feature is a built-in two-point capacitive touch pad on the front of the controller, which can be clicked. This allows the touch pad to represent multiple buttons, as demonstrated in the PS4 version of Elite Dangerous in which the four corners of the touch pad can be mapped to a separate clickable actions. The controller supports motion detection via a three-axis gyroscope and three-axis accelerometer and vibration. It includes a non-removable, rechargeable 3.7 V, 1000 mAh lithium-ion battery, which can be charged while the system is in rest mode.

The front of the controller features a light bar containing three LEDs that, when lit in conjunction, cause the light bar to glow a variety of colors. Developed for PlayStation VR, it can be used to identify players by matching the colors of the characters they control in a game, or to provide enhanced feedback or immersion by changing patterns or colors in reaction to gameplay. An early example of this is displayed in the game Grand Theft Auto V; the light bar will flash red and blue when the player is wanted by the police, simulating the flashing lights of a police car. The light bar is also used in conjunction with the PlayStation Camera to judge the positions and movements of multiple players.

The controller features several input and output connectors: a stereo headset jack (3.5 mm CTIA TRRS connector), a micro-USB port, and an extension port. It can be charged using the console, using a dedicated charging station, or via microUSB using a standalone charger. It also includes a mono speaker, like the Wii Remote, and is the second major controller in video game history to have such feature.

The DualShock 4 features the following buttons: PS button, SHARE button, OPTIONS button, directional buttons, action buttons (triangle, circle, cross, square), shoulder buttons (R1/L1), triggers (R2/L2), analog stick click buttons (L3/R3), and a touch pad click button. These mark several changes from the DualShock 3 and other previous PlayStation controllers. The START and SELECT buttons have been merged into a single OPTIONS button. A dedicated SHARE button allows players to upload screenshots and videos from their gameplay experiences. The joysticks and triggers have been redesigned based on developer input, with the ridged surface of the joysticks now featuring an outer ring surrounding the convex dome caps.

The DualShock 4's buttons differ slightly in functionality from the DualShock 3. Only the L2 and R2 triggers are pressure-sensitive, a change from the functionality of the DualShock 2 and 3. This is likely due to the fact that most games did not utilize these buttons as well as due to it not being used on competitors' controllers.

The PlayStation 3 is forward compatible with the DualShock 4 (originally only via a microUSB cable). Firmware update 4.60 for the PS3 added wireless connectivity; however, motion and vibration functions are not supported. As the START and SELECT buttons are no longer present, the OPTIONS and SHARE buttons respectively replace them. The PS button does not work, thus requiring the console to be reset in order to go back to the menu.

Version issues and modifications

Sony's earlier DualShock 4 controllers (CUH-ZCT1 controllers) had wear issues with the rubber surface on both analog sticks which exhibited excessive wear or tearing after short-term use. In January 2014, Sony issued a statement acknowledging an issue on 10% of controllers.

In early September 2016, Sony confirmed a second version of DualShock 4 controllers, known as the DualShock Version 2 (CUH-ZCT2), which hosts slight improvements over the original DualShock 4, including USB communication, improved triggers and joysticks, a longer battery life and the ability to see the light bar from the top of the touchpad. It released on September 15, 2016.

In the first generation controller, the light bar is a permanently illuminated, bright-colored light. The needless light pollution and battery drain prompted inquiries as to whether the light bar could be switched off by users. Sony executive Shuhei Yoshida initially responded in the negative in July 2013, though game developers have the option to disable the light in game. In early 2014, the company announced that a future update would allow the light bar to be dimmed, which was delivered in 1.70 in April 2014.

Variations

Color choices 
The original DualShock 4 (CUH-ZCT1) is available in Jet Black, Glacier White, Urban Camouflage, Wave Blue (black back), Magma Red (black back), Gold, Silver, and Steel Black.

The newer DualShock 4 (CUH-ZCT2) has been produced in Jet Black, Glacier White, Green Camouflage, Blue Camouflage, Red Camouflage, Rose Gold, Electric Purple, Wave Blue (blue back), Magma Red (red back), Gold, Silver, Sunset Orange, Crystal, Red Crystal, Blue Crystal, Steel Black, Midnight Blue, Metallic Copper, Alpine Green, and Berry Blue.

Controller model generations 
There are several versions of the DualShock 4 controller available on the market. The model number can be found on the back of the Controller below the text 'MADE IN CHINA' .

Exclusive console bundles with DualShock 4 include the 20th Anniversary Edition, Gun Metal, Batman: Arkham Knight, Metal Gear Solid V: The Phantom Pain, Call of Duty: Black Ops III, Uncharted 4: A Thief's End, Star Wars Battlefront, Monster Hunter World, God of War, Gran Turismo Sport, Call of Duty: World War II, The Days of Play, Marvel's Spider-Man, Death Stranding, The Last of Us Part II, and the 500 Million Limited Edition PS4 Pro.

DualSense

The DualSense (CFI-ZCT1W) is the PlayStation 5's controller and was unveiled on April 7, 2020. It is based on the DualShock 4 controller that came before it but with an evolution to its design and capabilities influenced by discussions with game designers and players.

There are several differences in the DualSense that sets it apart from previous DualShock controllers:
 The DualSense supports vibrotactile haptic provided by voice coil actuators integrated in the palm grips, and force feedback for the Adaptive Triggers provided by two DC rotary motors. The actuators in the hand grip able to give varied and intuitive feedback about in-game actions for example, in a sandstorm, you can feel the wind and sand, and the motors in the Adaptive Triggers supporting experiences such as virtually drawing an arrow from a bow.
 The DualSense has a two-tone coloring scheme (primarily white with black facing) and monochrome action buttons, marking the first time the action buttons for a standard PlayStation controller are not colored, although Sony's handheld consoles, the PlayStation Vita and PlayStation Portable, both had monochrome buttons. It incorporates a more ergonomic design that is noticeably bigger, rounder, and heftier than the DualShock 4. The light bar has been moved from the top of the controller to the horizontal edges of the touchpad, with player number instead being indicated by an array of 5 LEDs below the touchpad. The "Share" button has been replaced with "Create" with an expanded focus on creating content to share with others.
The controller speaker has been improved, now providing a clearer sound. The controller now also features a dual-microphone array, allowing players to communicate with each-other without requiring the use of an external headset. With the addition of microphones to the controller, Sony also introduced voice typing to the PS5.
The analog triggers now have a force feedback mechanism, allowing the controller to provide varying levels of resistance to the user depending on in-game actions. An example provided by Sony is being able to feel the tension of a bow string as the user pulls the trigger.
Connectivity includes a 3.5 mm audio jack, USB-C, which replaces the microUSB port on the DualShock 4, and copper pins for use with charging docks.
Its battery has been upgraded to a higher-rated capacity.
Also, the black plastic piece surrounding the analog sticks can easily be removed, without requiring any tools.

The DualSense has become a subject of a class-action lawsuit due to a perceived drift in one of the analog sticks, being litigated by the same firm that is challenging Nintendo for a similar drift issue in their Joy-Con for the Nintendo Switch.

Microtexture 
The DualSense has a unique microtexture. There are 40,000 tiny symbols (square, triangle, circle, cross) stacked on top of each other. Multiple designs were hand-drawn, digitized, and made as prototypes before the design team settled on the current design. The larger symbols are half a millimeter wide. Sean Hollister, for The Verge, wrote an article examining the microtexture and its creation:
The company decided to apply a microtexture to the DualSense controller's entire lower shell [making it] Sony's most grippable gamepad yet because of the thousands upon thousands of tiny squares, triangles, circles, and crosses literally at your fingertips. ... These tiny symbols are stacked on top of each other, jutting out in three dimensions. They're not a single, evenly spaced layer at all ... Morisawa, the senior art director of Sony's Design Center product design group, explains that a variety of designs were handcrafted, digitized, mocked up, applied to actual prototype gamepads, and tested over and over again until the teams found the balance they wanted: good-looking, textured enough to be comfortable and non-slip, but not so sandpaper-rough that it'd hurt your hands over a lengthy gaming session.
Hollister's article did mention one downside to the microtexture: "it picks up dirt extremely easily and doesn't want to let go".

Reception
The DualShock controller was given an Emmy Award for "Peripheral Development and Technological Impact of Video Game Controllers" by the National Academy of Television Arts and Sciences on January 8, 2007.

References

External links

Official North American DualShock 3 wireless page 
Official European DualShock 3 page 
Official European PlayStation 4 site, which includes details of the DualShock 4
Official North American PlayStation 4 site, which includes details of the DualShock 4

PlayStation 4 accessories
PlayStation 3 accessories
PlayStation 2 accessories
PlayStation (console) accessories
Game controllers
Products introduced in 1997
Virtual reality
Haptic technology